Pallas's tube-nosed bat (Nyctimene cephalotes), also known as the Torresian tube-nosed bat or northern tube-nosed bat, is a species of megabat in the Nyctimene genus found in Indonesia.  Its range may extend to New Guinea, but sightings may be attributable to misidentification.  Its range may at one time also have extended to Timor, but was extirpated due to habitat loss.

References

Nyctimene (genus)
Bats of Oceania
Bats of Indonesia
Least concern biota of Asia
Mammals described in 1767
Taxonomy articles created by Polbot
Taxa named by Peter Simon Pallas